The University of Mauritius (UoM) is the national  university of Mauritius. It is the oldest and largest university in the country in terms of student enrollment and curriculum offered. The public university's main campus is located at Réduit, Moka.

History 

The University of Mauritius was officially established by the University of Mauritius Ordinance in December 1965, incorporating the existing School of Agriculture. In 1971, the University of Mauritius Act further defined the objects, powers, functions and structure of the university. On 24 March 1972, Her Majesty Queen Elizabeth II, accompanied by His Royal Highness the Duke of Edinburgh, inaugurated the University of Mauritius. The first chancellor of the university of Mauritius was Her Royal Highness the Princess Alexandra, the Honourable Lady Ogilvy.

Organisation

Faculty of Agriculture 
The Faculty of Agriculture is the oldest faculty of the university. It was founded in 1914 as the School of Agriculture, and in 1966 it was incorporated into the newly established University of Mauritius.

The faculty comprises two departments: Agricultural & Food Science; and Agricultural Production & Systems. As of 2015, it has 415 students and 21 full-time academic staff.

Faculty of Engineering 
The Faculty of Engineering was originally established as the School of Industrial Technology in 1968. It comprises five departments: Applied Sustainability and Enterprise Development; Chemical and Environmental Engineering; Civil Engineering; Electrical and Electronic Engineering; and Mechanical and Production Engineering. As of 2015, it has 2665 students and 94 full-time academic staff.

Faculty of Information, Communication and Digital Technologies 
Faculty of Information, Communication and Digital Technologies (FoICDT) has been set-up to essentially respond to the significant human resource needs, in terms of quantity and quality, of the country to make Information and Communication Technology (ICT) sector the main pillar of the economy.

Faculty of Law & Management 
The Faculty of Law & Management was created in 1993, when the former School of Law, Management and Social Studies was restructured. It comprises three departments: Finance and Accounting; Law; and Management. As of 2015, it has 3691 students and 51 full-time academic staff.

Faculty of Ocean Studies 
The Faculty of Ocean Studies is the youngest and smallest faculty. It was established in 2014 and comprises three departments: Marine and Ocean Science, Fisheries and Mariculture; Ocean Engineering and ICT; and Maritime Trade and Finance. As of 2015, it has 13 students and 10 full-time academic staff.

Faculty of Science 
The Faculty of Science was founded as School of Science in 1988. It comprises six departments: Biosciences; Chemistry; Health Sciences; Mathematics; Medicine; and Physics. As of 2015, it has 1135 students and 52 full-time academic staff.

Faculty of Social Studies & Humanities 
The Faculty of Social Studies & Humanities was established in 1993, when the former School of Law, Management and Social Studies was restructured. It comprises five departments: Economics and Statistics; English Studies; French Studies; History and Political Science; and Social Studies. As of 2015, it has 2039 students and 68 full-time academic staff.

Centres 
In addition to the six faculties, the University of Mauritius also includes a Centre for Innovative Lifelong Learning (CILL), a Centre for Information Technology & Systems (CITS) and a Centre for Biomedical and Biomaterials Research (CBBR).

Students’ Union 
The Students’ Union is run by students and represents their interests. All students are automatically members of the Students’ Union, the membership fee being included in the registration free.

Notable alumni 
Audrey Albert, artist and photographer

References

External links

 

 
Educational institutions established in 1965
1965 establishments in Mauritius
Universities in Mauritius